The Balogh Defense (also known as the Balogh Counter Gambit) is an unusual chess opening beginning with the moves:
1. e4 d6
2. d4 f5
It may also arise by transposition from the Staunton Gambit against the Dutch Defense, 1.d4 f5 2.e4!?, if Black declines the gambit with 2...d6.

The defense is named for János Balogh (1892–1980), who was a Hungarian International Master of correspondence chess, and a strong master at over-the-board chess. The opening is rarely seen today because it weakens Black's kingside somewhat and often results in a backward e-pawn and/or a hole on e6 after Black's light-square bishop is exchanged. International Correspondence Chess Master Keith Hayward has recently written a series of articles arguing that the defense, though risky, is playable.

Illustrative games
The following game shows U.S. Champion Hikaru Nakamura using the Balogh Defense to beat a grandmaster:Eugene Perelshteyn (2579) vs. Hikaru Nakamura (2662), HB Global Chess Challenge 2005 1.e4 d6 2.d4 f5 3.exf5 Bxf5 4.Bd3 Qd7 5.Qf3 Bxd3 6.Qxd3 e6 7.Nf3 Nc6 8.0-0 0-0-0 9.c4 Nf6 10.Nc3 d5!? 11.c5 h6 12.b4! g5 13.b5 Na5! 14.Re1 Re8 15.Bd2 Nc4 16.Ne5 Qh7 17.Qe2 Nxe5 18.dxe5 Nd7 19.c6 Nb6 20.cxb7+ Kxb7 21.Be3 Bb4 22.Qb2?! Ba5! 23.Bd4 Nc4 24.Qe2 Rhf8 25.Red1 Bb6 26.Na4 Rf4 27.Nc5+ Kc8 28.Nb3 Qe4 29.Qxe4 Rxe4 30.a4 Bxd4 31.Nxd4 Nxe5 32.f3 Rf4 33.Ra2 Nc4 34.Nc6 a5 35.Re2 Rff8 36.Kf2 g4 37.Rd4 gxf3 38.gxf3 Kb7 39.Rxc4 dxc4 40.Nxa5+ Kb6 41.Nxc4+ Kc5 42.Ne5 Rf5 43.Re4 Ra8 44.Ke3 Rxa4! 45.Rxa4 Rxe5+ 46.Kf4 Rf5+ 47.Ke4 Kxb5 48.Ra7 Kc6 49.Ra6+ Kd7 50.Ra2 Rd5 51.Rg2 c5 52.Ra2 Ke7 53.Ra7+ Rd7 54.Ra8 Rd4+ 55.Ke5 Rd5+ 56.Ke4 Rh5 57.Ra7+ Kd6 58.Ra6+ Kd7 59.Ra7+ Kc6 60.Ra6+ Kb5 61.Rxe6 Rxh2 62.Kd3 h5 63.Re8 h4 
Most books, if they mention the Balogh Defense at all, say that it is refuted by 3.exf5 Bxf5 4.Qf3 Qc8 5.Bd3. Hayward believes that this game shows Black's best line against that variation:W. Jones vs. Hayward, correspondence 2000 1.e4 d6 2.d4 f5 3.exf5 Bxf5 4.Qf3 Qc8 5.Bd3 Bg4 6.Qf4 g6 7.Nc3 Bh6 8.Qg3 Bg7 9.Nge2 Nf6 10.Bg5 Nc6 11.f3 Bf5 12.Bxf5 Qxf5 13.0–0–0 e6 14.Rhe1 0–0 15.Nf4 Rae8 16.Re2 e5 17.dxe5 Rxe5 18.Rxe5 Qxe5 19.Re1 Qf5 20.Qh4 Re8 21.Rxe8+ Nxe8 22.Ncd5 Qe5 23.c3 a6 24.a3 Qf5 25.Ne3 Qd7 26.Nfd5 Qe6 27.f4 b5 28.f5 gxf5 29.Qf4 Ne5 30.Kb1 h6 31.Bh4 Bf8 32.Qxf5 Qxf5+ 33.Nxf5 c6 34.Nde3 Kf7 35.Bg3 Ke6 36.Kc2 c5 37.Bf4 h5 38.Ng3 Nf6 39.Bg5 Neg4 40.Nxg4 hxg4 41.h4 gxh3 42.gxh3 d5 43.Kd3 Bd6 44.Ne2 Ne4 45.Be3 Kf5 46.b4 c4+ 47.Kd4 Be5+ 48.Kxd5 Nxc3+ 49.Nxc3 Bxc3 50.h4 
Hayward believes that the following game shows best play by Black in what he considers the main line:Hayward vs. Owens, e-mail 1998 1. e4 d6 2. d4 f5 3. Nc3 Nf6 4. Bd3 fxe4 Balogh liked 4...Nc6, but Hayward considers 5.exf5! Nxd4 6.g4 difficult for Black. 5. Nxe4 Nxe4 6. Bxe4 An earlier game between these players continued 6.h4 Nxe4 7.Bxe4 d5 8.Bd3 Bg7 9.h5 Qd6 10.Nf3 Nc6 11.hxg6 hxg6 12.Rxh8+ Bxh8 13.Be3 Bg4 14.c3 0-0-0 15.Qa4 Bxf3 16.gxf3 e5 17.dxe5 Nxe5 18.Be2 a6 and Black was fine (0–1, 31). g6 7. Nf3 Rimlinger–Hayward, correspondence 2000 went 7.Qf3 c6 8.Bg5 Nd7 9.Qe3 Bg7 10.0-0-0 Nf6 11.Bf3 Bf5 12.Ne2 h6 13.Bxf6 Bxf6 14.h4 Qa5 15.Kb1 0-0-0 16.g4 Bd7 17.Nf4 g5 18.Ne6 Bxe6 19.Qxe6+ Kb8 20.hxg5 hxg5 21.c3 d5 22.Rh5 Qc7 23.Rdh1 Rhf8 24.Rh7 Qd6 25.Qe3 e5 26.dxe5 Bxe5 and Black had the superior pawn structure (but ½–½, 54). d5 8. Bd3 Bg7 9. 0-0 Nc6 10. c3 0-0 11. Bg5 Qd6 12. h3 Bf5 13. Re1 Rae8 14. Re3 e5 15. dxe5 Nxe5 16. Nxe5 Rxe5 17. Rxe5 Bxe5 18. Bh6 Re8 19. Bxf5 gxf5 20. Qh5 Qg6 21. Qxg6+ hxg6 22. Rd1 c6 ½–½

See also
 List of chess openings
 List of chess openings named after people

References

External links 

Hayward, Keith R. Balogh Counter Gambit, Part 1
Hayward, Keith R. Balogh Counter Gambit, Part 2: Janos Balogh, the Man and His Games
Hayward, Keith R. Balogh Counter Gambit, Part 3: White plays an early exf5
Hayward, Keith R. Balogh Counter Gambit, Part 4: Balogh's Main Line
Hayward, Keith R. Balogh Counter Gambit, Part 5: Remaining Lines
Hayward, Keith R. Balogh Counter Gambit, Part 6 (analysis of Perelshteyn–Nakamura)
 Symmetry and chaos: Balogh's Defense. from Chesscafe.com

Chess openings